Aurélien Jacques Capoue (born 28 February 1982) is a French former professional footballer who played as a midfielder.

International career
Capoue made his debut for Guadeloupe at the CONCACAF Gold Cup Finals in June 2007 against Haiti. He has been called up to the Guadeloupe squad for the 2009 CONCACAF Gold Cup.

Personal life
Capoue's younger brother, Étienne, is also a professional footballer, who currently plays for Villarreal.

References

External links
 
 

1982 births
Living people
People from Niort
Sportspeople from Deux-Sèvres
French footballers
Guadeloupean footballers
Guadeloupe international footballers
Association football midfielders
Vendée Fontenay Foot players
SO Romorantin players
FC Nantes players
AJ Auxerre players
US Boulogne players
Ligue 1 players
Ligue 2 players
2007 CONCACAF Gold Cup players
2009 CONCACAF Gold Cup players
French people of Guadeloupean descent
Footballers from Nouvelle-Aquitaine
US Boulogne non-playing staff